The 1933 Baylor Bears football team represented Baylor University in the Southwest Conference (SWC) during the 1933 college football season. In their eighth season under head coach Morley Jennings, the Bears compiled a 6–4 record (4–2 against conference opponents), tied for second place in the conference, and outscored opponents by a combined total of 85 to 84. They played their home games at Carroll Field in Waco, Texas. Frank James and Jim Tom Petty were the team captains.

Schedule

References

Baylor
Baylor Bears football seasons
Baylor Bears football